Abū Manṣūr Muḥammad b. Muḥammad b. Maḥmūd al-Ḥanafī al-Māturīdī al-Samarḳandī (853–944 CE), often referred to as Abū Manṣūr al-Māturīdī for short, or reverently referred to as Imām al-Māturīdī by Sunnī Muslims, was a Muslim scholar of Ḥanafī jurisprudence, scriptural exegete, reformer (mujaddid), and scholastic theologian (mutakallim), renowned for being the eponymous founder of the Māturīdī school of Islamic theology, which became the dominant Sunnī school of Islamic theology in Central Asia, and later enjoyed a preeminent status as the theological school of choice for both the Ottoman Empire and the Mughal Empire.

He was from a place called Māturīd or Māturīt in Samarqand (today Uzbekistan), and was known during his lifetime as Shaykh al-Islām and Imām al-Hudā ("Leader of Right Guidance"). He was one of the two foremost Imams of the Ashʿarite school in his time, along with its founder Abū al-Ḥasan al-Ashʿarī in matters of theological inquiry. In contrast to his master al-Ashʿarī, who was a Shāfiʿī jurist, al-Māturīdī adhered to the eponymous school of jurisprudence founded by Abū Ḥanīfa al-Nuʿmān, and to his creed (ʿaqīdah) as transmitted and elaborated by the Ḥanafī Muslim theologians of Balkh and Transoxania. It was this theological doctrine which al-Māturīdī codified, systematized, and used to refute not only the opinions of the Muʿtazilites, the Karramites, and other heterodox groups, but also non-Islamic theologies such as those of Chalcedonian Christianity, Miaphysitism, Manichaeanism, Marcionism, and Bardaisanism.

Name
Abū Manṣūr al-Māturīdī's epithet or nisba refers to Māturīd or Māturīt, a locality in Samarkand (today Uzbekistan).

Teachers 
He studied under his teachers, Muhammad bin Muqatil al-Razi (d. 248 H/ 662 CE), Abu Nasr al-Ayadi "al-Faqih al-Samarqandi" (d. 260 H?), Nusayr bin Yahya al-Balkhi (d. 268 H/ 881 CE), and Abu Bakr al-Juzjani (d. 250 H?). He narrated Abu Hanifa's Kitab al-Alim wa Mut'alim from Abu Bakr al-Juzjani, who narrated it from Muhammad ibn Muqatil ar-Razi (and Abu Sulayman al-Juzjani).

His chains to Abu Hanifa are given as follows:
He took from Muhammad bin Muqatil al-Razi (d. 248 H), from Muhammad al-Shaybani (d. 189 H), from Abu Hanifa (d. 150 H).
He took from Abu Nasr al-Ayadi (d. 260 H?), Nusayr al-Balkhi (d. 268 H) and Abu Bakr al-Juzjani (d. 250 H?), who all took from Abu Sulayman al-Juzjani (d. 200 H?), who took from both Muhammad al-Shaybani and Abu Yusuf (d. 182 H), who both took from Abu Hanifa.
He took from Muhammad bin Muqatil al-Razi and Nusayr al-Balkhi, who additionally both took from Abu Muti al-Hakam al-Balkhi (d. 199 H) and Abu Muqatil Hafs al-Samarqandi (d. 208 H), who both took from Abu Hanifa.
He took from Abu Nasr al-Ayadi, who took from Abu Ahmad bin Ishaq al-Juzjani (died mid- third century), who took directly from Muhammad al-Shaybani, who took from Abu Hanifa.

Students 
Among his students: Ali bin Said Abu al-Hasan al-Rustughfani, Abu Muhammad Abdal-Karim bin Musa bin Isa al-Bazdawi, and Abu al-Qasim al-Hakim al-Samarqandi.

Life
Al‑Maturidi was born at Maturid, a village or quarter in the neighbourhood of Samarkand. Relatively little is known about the life of Maturidi, as the sources available "do not read as biographies, but rather as lists of works that have been enlarged upon by brief statements on his personage and a few words of praise." What is evident, however, is that the theologian lived the life of a pure scholar, as "nothing indicates that he held any public office, nor that he possessed more disciples, popularity, or association with the Sāmānid court of Bukhārā than anyone else." It is accepted, moreover, that Maturidi had two principal teachers, namely Abū Bakr al-Jūzjānī and Abū Naṣr Aḥmad b. al-ʿAbbās al-ʿIyāḍī (d. ca. 874–892), both of whom played significant roles in the shaping of Maturidi's theological views. Maturidi is said to have lived the life of an ascetic (zāhid), and various sources attribute numerous miracles (karāmāt) to him. Although he is not usually considered a mystic, it is nevertheless very possible that Maturidi had some interaction with the Sufis of his area, as "Hanafite theology in the region could not always be sharply separated from mystical tendencies," and many of the most important Hanafi jurists of the area were also Sufi mystics.

Theology

Maturidi defined faith (īmān) as taṣdīḳ bi ’l-ḳalb or "inner assent, expressed by verbal confession (ịḳrār bi ’l-lisān)." For Maturidi, moreover, Islamic works (aʿmāl) are not a part of faith. Additionally, Maturidi held that "faith cannot decrease nor increase in substance, though it may be said to increase through renewal and repetition."

Maturidi supported using allegorical interpretation with respect to the anthropomorphic expressions in the Quran, though he rejected many of the interpretations the Mutazilites would reach using this method. In other instances, Maturidi espoused using the traditionalist bilā kayf method of reading scripture, which insisted on "unquestioning acceptance of the revealed text." Maturidi further refuted the Mutazilites in his defense of the Attributes of God "as real and eternally subsisting" in the Essence of God (ḳāʾima bi ’l-d̲h̲āt). His chief theological divergence from Ashʿarī was that he held the attributes of essence and action to be "equally eternal and subsistent in the Divine Essence." Thus, "he insisted that the expressions 'God is eternally the Creator' and 'God has been creating from eternity (lam yazal k̲h̲āliḳan)' are equally valid, even though the created world is temporal." Furthermore, Maturidi staunchly defended the notion of non-theophanic vision of God (ruʾya) against the Mutazilites, and "consistently rejected the possibility of idrāk, which he understood as grasping, of God by the eyes."

Contrary to popular assumption, Al-Maturidi was not a student of Al-Ash'ari. The historian al-Bayadi (d. 1078 H) emphasised this saying, "Maturidi is not Ash'ari's follower, as many people would tend to think. He had upheld Sunni Islam long before Ashari, he was a scholar to thoroughly explain and systematically develop Abu Hanifa's and his followers' school".

Work
When Maturidi was growing up there was an emerging reaction against some schools within Islam, notably Mu'tazilis, Qarmati, and Shi'a. Maturidi, with other two preeminent scholars, wrote especially on the creed of Islam, the other two being Abu al-Hasan al-Ash'ari in Iraq, and Ahmad ibn Muhammad al-Tahawi in Egypt.

While Al-Ash'ari were Sunni together with Maturidi, he constructed his own theology diverging slightly from Abu Hanifa's school. Gimaret argued that Al-Ash'ari enunciated that God creates the individual's power (qudra), will, and the actual act, which according to Hye, gives way to a fatalist school of theology, which was later put in a consolidated form by Al Ghazali. According to Encyclopædia Britannica however, Al-Ashari held the doctrine of Kasb as an explanation for how free will and predestination can be reconciled. Maturidi, followed in Abu Hanifa's footsteps, and presented the "notion that God was the creator of man's acts, although man possessed his own capacity and will to act". Maturidi and Al-Ash'ari also separated from each other in the issue of the attributes of God, as well as some other minor issues.

Later, with the impact of Turkic society states such as Great Seljuq Empire and Ottoman Empire, Hanafi-Maturidi school spread to greater areas where the Hanafi school of law is prevalent, such as Pakistan, Afghanistan, Central Asia, South Asia, Balkan, Russia, China, Caucasus and Turkey.

Maturidi had immense knowledge of dualist beliefs (Sanawiyya) and of other old Persian religions. His Kitāb al-Tawḥīd in this way has become a primary source for modern researchers with its rich materials about Iranian Manicheanism (Mâniyya), a group of Brahmans (Barähima), and some controversial personalities such as Ibn al-Rawandi, Abu Isa al-Warraq, and Muhammad b. Shabib.

Legacy and veneration
Although there was in the medieval period "a tendency to suppress Maturidi's name and to put Ashʿarī forward as the champion of Islam against all heretics," except in Transoxiana, Maturidism gradually "came to be widely recognised as the second orthodox Sunni theological school besides" Ashʿarīsm. It is evident from the surviving fifteenth-century accounts of Maturidi's tomb in the cemetery of Jākardīza in Samarkand that the theologian's tomb was  "visited ... and held in honor for a long time" throughout the medieval period. This veneration of the theologian seems to have arisen out of traditions preserved by several later scholars which detailed Maturidi's wisdom and spiritual abilities. For example, Abul Muīn al-Nasafī (d. 1114) stated that Maturidi's spiritual gifts were "immeasurably plentiful" and that "God singled him out with miracles (kāramāt), gifts of grace (mawāhib), divine assistance (tawfiq), and guidance (irshād, tashdīd)."

Contemporary Salafism and Wahhabism, however, tends to be very critical of Maturidi's legacy in Sunni Islam due to their aversion towards using any rational thought in matters of theology, which they deem to be heretical, despite this antagonism being a position that conflicts with the consensus of Sunnism throughout history. As such, it is often said that mainstream "orthodox Sunnism" constitutes the followers of the theological traditions of Maturidi and Ashʿarī,  while Salafism and Wahhabism have often been interpreted by the proponents of the two major schools to be minority splinter theological traditions opposed to the mainstream. Furthermore, the minor theoretical differences between the theological formulations of Maturidi and Ashʿarī are often deemed by their respective followers to be superficial rather than real,  whence "the two schools are equally orthodox" in traditional Sunnism. The traditional Sunni point of view is summarized in the words of the twentieth-century Islamic publisher Munīr ʿAbduh Agha, who stated: "There is not much [doctrinal] difference between the Ashʿarīs and Māturīdīs, hence both groups are now called People of the Sunna and the Community."

Writings
 Kitab al-Tawhid ('Book of Monotheism')
 Ta'wilat Ahl al-Sunnah or Ta'wilat al-Qur'an ('Book of the Interpretations of the Quran')
 Kitāb Radd Awa'il al-Adilla, a refutation of a Mu'tazili book
 Radd al-Tahdhib fi al-Jadal, another refutation of a Mu'tazili book
 Kitāb Bayan Awham al-Mu'tazila ('Book of Exposition of the Errors of Mu'tazila)
 Kitāb al-Maqalat
 Ma'akhidh al-Shara'i' in Usul al-Fiqh
 Al-Jadal fi Usul al-Fiqh
 Radd al-Usul al-Khamsa, a refutation of Abu Muhammad al-Bahili's exposition of the Five Principles of the Mu'tazila
 Radd al-Imama, a refutation of the Shi'i conception of the office of Imam;
 Al-Radd 'ala Usul al-Qaramita
 Radd Wa'id al-Fussaq, a refutation of the Mu'tazili doctrine that all grave sinners will be eternally in hell fire.

See also

 Maturidi
 Abu Hanifa
 Abu al-Mu'in al-Nasafi
 Abu Bakr al-Samarqandi
 2020 International Maturidi Conference
 Imam Maturidi International Scientific Research Center
 List of Ash'aris and Maturidis
 List of Muslim theologians

References

Notes

Sources

Further reading

Primary
 Bazdawī, Uṣūl al-dīn, ed. H. P. Linss, Cairo 1383/1963, index s.v.
 Abu ’l-Muʿīn al-Nasafī, Tabṣirat al-adilla, quoted in Muḥammad b. Tāwīt al-Ṭānd̲j̲ī, Abū Manṣūr al-Māturīdī, in IFD, iv/1-2 (1955), 1–12
 Ibn Abi ’l-Wafāʾ, al-Ḏj̲awāhir al-muḍīʾa, Ḥaydarābād 1332/1914, ii, 130-1
 Bayāḍī, Is̲h̲ārāt al-marām, ed. Yūsuf ʿAbd al-Razzāḳ, Cairo 1368/1949, 23
 Zabīdī, Itḥāf al-sāda, Cairo n.d., ii, 5
 Laknawī, al-Fawāʾid al-bahiyya, Cairo 1924, 195

Secondary
 M. Allard, Le problème des attributs divins dans la doctrine d’al-Ašʿarī, Beirut 1965, 419–27
 M. Götz, "Māturīdī und sein Kitāb Taʾwīlāt al-Qurʾān," in Isl., xli (1965), 27–70
 H. Daiber, "Zur Erstausgabe von al-Māturīdī, Kitāb al-Tauḥīd," in Isl., lii (1975), 299–313

Online
 Abū Manṣūr Muḥammad al-Māturīdī: Muslim theologian, in Encyclopædia Britannica Online, by The Editors of Encyclopædia Britannica and Adam Zeidan

External links
 Biography of Imâm Al Mâturîdî by Shaykh GF Haddâd
 Biography of Imâm Al Mâturîdî by at-tawhid.net

853 births
944 deaths
9th-century Iranian writers
9th-century Muslim theologians
10th-century Iranian writers
10th-century Muslim theologians
Abu Ayyub al-Ansari
Asharis
Hanafi fiqh scholars
Hadith scholars
Iranian people of Arab descent
Maturidis
Mujaddid
Muslim scholars of Islamic jurisprudence
Persian Sunni Muslim scholars of Islam
Quranic exegesis scholars
Salaf
Samanid scholars
Shaykh al-Islāms
Sunni imams
Sunni Muslim scholars of Islam
Transoxanian Islamic scholars